or com tam is a Vietnamese dish made from rice with fractured rice grains.  refers to the broken rice grains, while  refers to cooked rice. Although there are varied names like  (Saigon-style broken rice), particularly for Saigon, the main ingredients remain the same for most cases.

History 

In its early days, Com Tam was a popular dish among poor rice farmers in the Mekong Delta due to their economic circumstances. During bad rice seasons, these people didn't have enough good rice to sell, so they used broken rice to cook. Broken rice is fragments of rice grains broken during the handling processes and was regarded as inferior rice at the time. Broken rice was used solely because it was readily available in the farmers' houses and could fill their stomachs for a long time.

Since Vietnam's urbanization in the first half of the 20th century, Com Tam became popular across Southern provinces, including Saigon. When Saigon was bustling with many people from many countries around the world, food sellers adapted Com Tam to be more suitable for foreign customers like the French, American, Chinese, and Indian. As a result, grilled pork, chả trứng (Vietnamese-style steamed omelet with pork) was added to Com Tam. Also, the portion started being served on plates with a fork instead of in traditional bowls with chopsticks. Nowadays, Com Tam is popular among everyone, and is a "standardized part of the [Saigon] culture", so much that there is a common metaphorical saying (translated from Vietnamese): "Saigon people eat Com Tam like Ha Noi people eat Pho".

Ingredients 
Although there are many variations of Com Tam that have different ingredients and styles, a popular, featured Com Tam dish commonly known as "Cơm Tấm Sườn Bì Chả" has the following ingredients:

Broken Rice - a traditionally cheaper grade of rice produced by damage in milling. It is mainly used as a food industry ingredient in America and Europe, but in West Africa and Southeast Asia is used for direct human consumption. Broken rice is fragmented, not defective; there is nothing wrong with it. This is the main ingredient of Com Tam.
 Sườn nướng - Grilled pork ribs
 Bì - thin strands of pork and cooked pork skin seasoned with roast rice powder
 Chả trứng - Vietnamese-style steamed omelet with meatloaf. Nowadays this may be substituted with an omelet or fried egg
 Scallion and oil garnish - chopped scallion lightly fried in heated oil until softened (serve both scallion and oil)
 Various vegetables, such as sliced cucumber and tomato, and pickled vegetables such as carrot and radish pickles
 Mixed fish sauce (Nước mắm pha) - a sweet, sour, salty, savory or spicy sauce served in a small bowl beside the Com Tam dish. This ingredient is commonly considered an important part of a Com Tam dish

Serving 
Although chopsticks are commonly used by Vietnamese, Com Tam are enjoyed with a fork and spoon; and although the mixed fish sauce is commonly used for dipping in other Vietnamese dishes, for Com Tam, the sauce is for spreading onto the dish as needed.

Honors 
Com Tam is one of 10 Vietnamese dishes recognized by the Asia Record Organisation (ARO) for their important culinary value to the international community.

See also

 Broken rice
 Bánh mì
 List of Vietnamese culinary specialities
 List of Vietnamese dishes
 Vietnamese cuisine

References

Vietnamese rice dishes
Vietnamese words and phrases
Vietnamese pork dishes